The Windsor Regiment (RCAC) is a Primary Reserve armoured regiment of the Canadian Army, based in Windsor, Ontario and is part of the 4th Canadian Division's 31 Canadian Brigade Group.

Lineage

The Windsor Regiment (RCAC) 
The Windsor Regiment (RCAC) originated in Windsor, Ontario, on 15 December 1936 as The Essex Regiment (Tank), named after Essex County. It was redesignated as the 30th (Reserve) Reconnaissance Battalion (Essex Regiment) on 27 January 1942; as the 30th (Reserve) Reconnaissance Regiment (Essex Regiment), CAC on 8 June 1942; as the 30th (Reserve) Reconnaissance Regiment (Essex Regiment), RCAC on 2 August 1945; as the 22nd Reconnaissance Regiment (Essex Regiment), RCAC on 1 April 1946; as The Windsor Regiment (22nd Reconnaissance Regiment) on 4 February 1949; as The Windsor Regiment (22nd Armoured Regiment) on 1 October 1954; as  The Windsor Regiment (RCAC) on 19 May 1958; as The Windsor Regiment on 19 September 1985. On 14 August 1997 the regiment reverted to its previous designation as The Windsor Regiment (RCAC).

Lineage chart

Operational history

Second World War
Details from the regiment were called out on active service for local protection duties on 28 May 1940 as The Essex Regiment (Tank), CASF (Details). 

The regiment subsequently mobilized an armour regiment designated the 30th Reconnaissance Battalion (The Essex Regiment), CAC, CASF for active service on 12 May 1942. It was redesignated the 30th Reconnaissance Regiment (The Essex Regiment), CAC, CASF on 8 June 1942. It served in Canada in a home defence and training role as part of Military District No. 12. On 23 July 1943 it embarked for Britain where its soldiers were employed as assembly workers for unassembled vehicles arriving from Canada. The regiment was subsequently disbanded on 31 March 1944.

Alliances 
 - The Royal Scots Dragoon Guards (Carabiniers and Greys)

Battle honours
The Windsor Regiment (RCAC) was awarded its first battle honour on 9 May 2014: the theatre honour AFGHANISTAN. Elizabeth Dowdeswell, Lieutenant Governor of Ontario, presented the regiment with a new guidon that includes this battle honour on 24 September 2022.

Media
Black Beret: A History of the Windsor Regiment (RCAC), 1936-2006 by Michael R. McNorgan (Jan 2006)

Order of precedence

References

External links
 The Windsor Regiment (RCAC) Official Webpage. 
   Museum

Armoured regiments of Canada
Military units and formations of Ontario
Military units and formations established in 1936